Bebelis lignosa is a species of beetle in the family Cerambycidae. It was described by Thomson in 1864. Bebelis lignosa are found in South America and Central America.  The Beetles have a brown pattern on their back.

References

Bebelis
Beetles described in 1864